Afef Jnifen (born 3 November 1963) is a Tunisian-born Italian fashion model, actress and television presenter.

Biography 
Jnifen was born in 1963 in Ben Gardane, Tunisia and naturalized Italian citizen. She is the daughter of the former Tunisian ambassador Mohamed Jnifen, who also was ambassador in Libya, Egypt, Saudi Arabia, Lebanon, Syria, Yemen, and Bahrain. Her mother, Saida Benina, is of Turkish origin.  

Her modeling career began when she was discovered by photographer Jean-Paul Goude, who spotted her walking on the beach while he was shooting a Club Med ad with Carla Bruni in the Bahamas. Goude put Jnifen in the ad and suggested her to go to Paris and meet the designer Azzedine Alaïa. She quickly became a favorite model of many of Europe's top designers, travelling between Milan and Paris while working for Armani, Fendi, Jean Paul Gaultier, Roberto Cavalli, and others. Jnifen's career in fashion has since spanned three decades representing top international brands such as L'Oréal, Paris.

Jnifen bcame known to the Italian public as an hostess of the television program Maurizio Costanzo Show in 1982 on Canale 5. She hosted the television programs Quelli che... il calcio in 1993 on Rai 3, Scommettiamo che.... in 1999 with Fabrizio Frizzi on Rai 1, and La grande notte  in 2006 with Gene Gnocchi on Rai 2. In 2006, she decided to take a step back from the public eye. 

In 1999, she appeared in an episode of the series Il commissario Montalbano. 

In 2016 and 2017, Jnifen starred in Project Runway Middle East on MBC as a jury member along with Lebanese designer Elie Saab and Egyptian actress Yousra. In 2017, she was named ambassador of "Fashion 4 Development". In 2018, she made a comeback in modeling.

Personal life 
Jnifen have been married four times, the first one was when she was young in Tunisia; the second from 1990 to 2001 with the lawyer Marco Squatri (one son together); The third from 2001 to 2018 with the businessman Marco Tronchetti Provera, chairman and CEO of Pirelli & C. S.p.A. and Telecom Italia; and the fourth since October 2021 with the businessman Alessandro del Bono.

References

External links 

Living people
1963 births
People from Ben Gardane
Tunisian female models
Tunisian women television presenters
Italian television presenters
Italian showgirls
Italian women television presenters
Tunisian people of Turkish descent
Italian people of Tunisian descent
Italian people of Turkish descent
Tunisian emigrants to Italy
Muslim models